Chevron Phillips Chemical Company, LLC is a petrochemical company jointly owned by Chevron Corporation and Phillips 66. The company was formed July 1, 2000 by merging the chemicals operations of both Chevron Corporation and Phillips Petroleum Company. As equally-owned company, it is governed by a board of directors composed of three members from each of the parent companies.  The company was actually named in a coin toss to determine which parent company name would be first and which would be last.

Chevron Phillips is headquartered in The Woodlands, Texas,  a northern suburb of Houston, and is a major producer of ethylene, propylene, polyethylene, Alpha-olefins, Polyalphaolefins, aromatic compounds and a range of specialty chemicals.

Operations 
As of the end of 2014 the company has 5,000 employees worldwide, US$9 billion in assets, and 36 manufacturing and research facilities in eight countries, including the United States, Belgium, China, Colombia, Qatar, Saudi Arabia, Singapore, and South Korea.  It has 24 facilities in 13 U.S. states.

Corporate affairs
The headquarters and offices for the Americas are in The Woodlands, Texas. Europe, Middle East, and Africa operations are based in Stockholm Building in Airport Plaza in Diegem, Belgium. Asia Pacific operations are based in Keppel Bay Tower in Singapore.

See also
 Phillips disaster of 1989
 Phillips explosion of 1999
 Phillips explosion of 2000

References

External links
 

Oil companies of the United States
Petrochemical companies
Chevron Corporation
Phillips 66
Petroleum in Texas
Companies based in Houston
Non-renewable resource companies established in 2000
2000 establishments in Texas
Joint ventures